Tomorrow I'll Wake Up and Scald Myself with Tea is a 1977 Czechoslovak comical science fiction film directed by Jindřich Polák. It is a screen adaptation of Josef Nesvadba's short story with the same title.

Plot
In the near future, a technology enabling time travel has been developed and is now in commercial use. A group of unaging (thanks to anti-aging pills, which have also been developed) former Nazis conspires to alter the results of the Second World War by traveling back in time and supplying Adolf Hitler with a hydrogen bomb. To this end, they bribe the corrupt time machine pilot Karel, who agrees to assist them. On the day of the scheduled journey, Karel chokes on a croissant and dies. His identical twin brother, Jan, cannot bring himself to tell Karel's fiancée Eva and begins to impersonate Karel. He is also later mistaken for Karel by the Nazis and stumbles along with their plot. Having been a designer of the rocket-ship time machine, he is able to pilot the ship and take them all back in time. When he realizes the nature of the Nazis' plans, Jan resolves to prevent their success. After triggering several paradoxes by travelling back and forth in time, he manages to defeat the Nazis and resolve the consequences of his twin's death.

Cast

References

External links
 

1977 films
Cultural depictions of Adolf Hitler
1970s science fiction comedy films
Czechoslovak science fiction comedy films
Films directed by Jindřich Polák
Films about time travel
Czech science fiction comedy films
1977 comedy films